Fractal analysis is useful in the study of complex networks, present in both natural and artificial systems such as computer systems, brain and social networks, allowing further development of the field in network science.

Self-similarity of complex networks
  
Many real networks have two fundamental properties, scale-free property and small-world property. If the degree distribution of the network follows a power-law, the network is scale-free; if any two arbitrary nodes in a network can be connected in a very small number of steps, the network is said to be small-world.

The small-world properties can be mathematically expressed by the slow increase of the average diameter of the network, with the total number of nodes ,

where  is the shortest distance between two nodes.

Equivalently, we obtain:

    
where  is a characteristic length.

For a self-similar structure, a power-law relation is expected rather than the exponential relation above. From this fact, it would seem that the small-world networks are not self-similar under a length-scale transformation.

Self-similarity has been discovered in the solvent-accessible surface areas of proteins. Because proteins form globular folded chains, this discovery has important implications for protein evolution and protein dynamics, as it can be used to establish characteristic dynamic length scales for protein functionality.

The methods for calculation of the dimension 

Generally we calculate the fractal dimension using either the box counting method or the cluster growing method.

The box counting method

Let    be the number of boxes of linear size , needed to cover the given network. The fractal dimension  is then given by

This means that the average number of vertices  within a box of size 

The cluster growing method

One seed node is chosen randomly. If the minimum distance  is given, a cluster of nodes separated by at most  from the seed node can be formed. The procedure is repeated  by choosing many seeds until the clusters cover the whole network. Then the dimension  can be calculated by

where  is the average mass of the clusters, defined as the average number of nodes in a cluster.

These methods are difficult to apply to networks since networks are generally not embedded in another space.  In order to measure the fractal dimension of networks we add the concept of renormalization.

Fractal scaling in scale-free networks

Box-counting and renormalization
To investigate self-similarity in networks, we use the box-counting method and renormalization. Fig.(3a) shows this procedure using a network composed of 8 nodes.

For each size lB, boxes are chosen randomly (as in the cluster growing method) until the network is covered, A box consists of nodes all separated by a distance of l < lB, that is every pair of nodes in the box must be separated by a minimal paths of at most lB links. Then each box is replaced by a node(renormalization). The  renormalized nodes are connected if there is at least one link between the unrenormalized boxes. This procedure is repeated until the network collapses to one node. Each of these boxes has an effective mass (the number of nodes in it) which can be used as shown above to measure the fractal dimension of the network. In Fig.(3b), renormalization is applied to a WWW network through three steps for lB = 3.

Fig.(5) shows the invariance of the degree distribution P(k) under the renormalization performed as a function of the box size on the World Wide Web. The networks are also invariant under multiple renormalizations applied for a fixed box size lB. This invariance suggests that the networks are self-similar on multiple length scales.

Skeleton and fractal scaling

The fractal properties of the network can be seen in its underlying tree structure. In this view, the network consists of the skeleton and the shortcuts. The skeleton is a special type of spanning tree, formed by the edges having the highest betweenness centralities, and the remaining edges in the network are shortcuts.
If the original network is scale-free, then its skeleton also follows a power-law degree distribution, where the degree can be different from the degree of the original network. For the fractal networks following fractal scaling, each skeleton shows fractal scaling similar to that of the original network. The number of boxes to cover the skeleton is almost the same as the number needed to cover the network.

Real-world fractal networks

Since fractal networks and their skeletons follow the relation
,
we can investigate whether a network is fractal and what is the fractal dimension of the network. For example, the WWW, the human brain, metabolic network, protein interaction network (PIN) of H. sapiens, and PIN of S. cerevisiaeare considered    as fractal networks. On the other hand, the Internet, actor network, and artificial models (for instance, the BA model) do not show the fractal properties.

Other definitions for network dimensions
The best definition of dimension for a complex network  or graph depends on the application. For example, metric dimension is defined in terms of the resolving set for a graph. Definitions based on the scaling property of the "mass" as defined above with distance,
or based on the complex network zeta function have also been studied.

References

Network theory